Microprius rufulus is a species of cylindrical bark beetle with a distribution throughout tropical Africa from Cape Verde Islands to Madagascar, northern Africa, Middle East, and South Asia. The species is also introduced and show sporadic distribution in Germany, Cuba, USA, Malta and Cayman Islands.

The typical size is about 3.2 mm. Can be found under bark of trees but can be attracted to light.

Description

References 

Cerambycinae
Insects of Sri Lanka
Insects of India
Insects described in 1863